Ernie Parker defeated Harry Parker 2–6, 6–1, 6–3, 6–2 in the final to win the men's singles tennis title at the 1913 Australasian Championships.

Draw

Key
 Q = Qualifier
 WC = Wild card
 LL = Lucky loser
 r = Retired

Top half

Bottom half

External links
  Grand Slam Tennis Archive – Australasian Open 1913
 

1913 in Australian tennis
Singles